In mathematics, a composition of an integer n is a way of writing n as the sum of a sequence of (strictly) positive integers. Two sequences that differ in the order of their terms define different compositions of their sum, while they are considered to define the same partition of that number. Every integer has finitely many distinct compositions. Negative numbers do not have any compositions, but 0 has one composition, the empty sequence. Each positive integer n has 2n−1 distinct compositions.

A weak composition of an integer n is similar to a composition of n, but allowing terms of the sequence to be zero: it is a way of writing n as the sum of a sequence of non-negative integers. As a consequence every positive integer admits infinitely many weak compositions (if their length is not bounded). Adding a number of terms 0 to the end of a weak composition is usually not considered to define a different weak composition; in other words, weak compositions are assumed to be implicitly extended indefinitely by terms 0.

To further generalize, an  A-restricted composition of an integer n, for a subset A of the (nonnegative or positive) integers, is an ordered collection of one or more elements in A whose sum is n.

Examples 

The sixteen compositions of 5 are:
5
4 + 1
3 + 2
3 + 1 + 1
2 + 3
2 + 2 + 1
2 + 1 + 2
2 + 1 + 1 + 1
1 + 4
1 + 3 + 1
1 + 2 + 2
1 + 2 + 1 + 1
1 + 1 + 3
1 + 1 + 2 + 1
1 + 1 + 1 + 2
1 + 1 + 1 + 1 + 1.

Compare this with the seven partitions of 5:
5
4 + 1
3 + 2
3 + 1 + 1
2 + 2 + 1
2 + 1 + 1 + 1
1 + 1 + 1 + 1 + 1.

It is possible to put constraints on the parts of the compositions.  For example the five compositions of 5 into distinct terms are:
5
4 + 1
3 + 2
2 + 3
1 + 4.

Compare this with the three partitions of 5 into distinct terms:
5
4 + 1
3 + 2.

Number of compositions 

Conventionally the empty composition is counted as the sole composition of 0, and there are no compositions of negative integers.
There are 2n−1 compositions of n ≥ 1; here is a proof:

Placing either a plus sign or a comma in each of the n − 1 boxes of the array

produces a unique composition of n. Conversely, every composition of n determines an assignment of pluses and commas. Since there are n − 1 binary choices, the result follows. The same argument shows that the number of compositions of n into exactly k parts (a k-composition) is given by the binomial coefficient .  Note that by summing over all possible numbers of parts we recover 2n−1 as the total number of compositions of n:

 

It follows from this formula that the number of weak compositions of n into exactly k parts equals the number of weak compositions of k − 1 into exactly n + 1 parts.

Homogeneous polynomials 
The dimension of the vector space  of homogeneous polynomial of degree d in n variables over the field K is the number of weak compositions of d into n parts. In fact, a basis for the space is given by the set of monomials  such that . Since the exponents  are allowed to be zero, then the number of such monomials is exactly by the number of weak compositions of d.

See also 
 Stars and bars (combinatorics)

References

External links 
 Partition and composition calculator

Number theory
Combinatorics